Sir Arthur Newcomen, 7th Baronet (1701 – 25 November 1759) was an Anglo-Irish politician.

Newcomen was the son of Sir Robert Newcomen, 6th Baronet and succeeded to his father's title on 6 March 1735. He was the Member of Parliament for Longford County in the Irish House of Commons between 1735 and his death in 1759.

References

1701 births
1759 deaths
18th-century Anglo-Irish people
Baronets in the Baronetage of Ireland
Irish MPs 1727–1760
Members of the Parliament of Ireland (pre-1801) for County Longford constituencies
Newcomen family